Enfer [De La Bibliothèque Nationale] is the fifth album of the Italian heavy metal  band Mastercastle. The lyrics of the album tell about a secret section of the National Library of Paris. There are also two instrumental tracks, the first "Coming Bach" is a remake of the Prelude in D minor BWV 999 by Johann Sebastian Bach.

History
The album was recorded starting from June 2014 and was finished in August 2014. It was recorded by Pier Gonella and mixed by Pier Gonella and Giuseppe Orlando at MusicArt studios.

Track listing
All lyrics by Giorgia Gueglio.

Line up
 Giorgia Gueglio – voice
 Pier Gonella – guitars
 Steve Vawamas – bass
 Francesco La Rosa – drums

References

External links
 Mastercastle – Official site of the band
 Mastercastle – Official facebook site of the band

2014 albums
Mastercastle albums